Buenavista Airport  is an airport serving the towns of Fonseca and Distracción in the La Guajira Department of Colombia.

See also

Transport in Colombia
List of airports in Colombia

References

External links
OpenStreetMap - Buenavista
OurAirports - Buenavista
SkyVector - Buenavista
FallingRain - Buenavista Airport

Airports in Colombia